Submission wrestling, also known as Submission grappling or Submission fighting, is a combat sport that focus on clinch and ground fighting with the aim of obtaining a submission through the use of submission holds. The term usually refers to a form of competition and training that does not use the Gi, the "combat kimono" worn in traditional martial arts. No-Gi Brazilian jiu-jitsu (BJJ) is the most well known subset of submission wrestling, with the ADCC Submission Fighting World Championship considered its most prestigious tournament.

The sport of submission wrestling brings together techniques from Catch wrestling, Folk wrestling, Greco-Roman wrestling, Freestyle wrestling, Jujutsu, Judo, Brazilian jiu-jitsu, Luta Livre and Sambo. Submission wrestlers known as grapplers usually wear shorts and rash guards.

Generic term
Mixed martial arts schools and fighters may use the term submission wrestling to refer to their grappling methods while avoiding association with any one art. The label is sometimes also used to describe the tactic in mixed martial arts competition of relying primarily upon submission wrestling skills to defeat an opponent.

Styles
Catch wrestling: Also called "catch-as-catch-can", the style of grappling (without the gi) originating in Lancashire, Northern England and later became the dominant wrestling style in America during the 19th century, has experienced a resurgence during recent years due to MMA popularity. Early professional wrestling was once competitive catch wrestling before the sport slowly transitioned to sportive entertainment during the mid-1920s.
Judo: A Japanese martial art focusing on high impact throws, pins, joint-locks, and chokes.
Japanese jiu-jitsu or jujutsu: An ancient art of Japanese wrestling/grappling that places a heavy emphasis on joint-locks, chokes and throws. Uses a gi traditionally, but training without one is not uncommon.
Sport Sambo: A Russian style of grappling that typically uses a jacket, but without gi pants. Sambo uses leglocks, but most styles do not permit chokes.
Brazilian jiu-jitsu: An increasingly popular style with great emphasis on ground grappling. It involves training with and without a gi.
Luta livre esportiva (pt): A form of submission wrestling which derived from Catch wrestling, native to Brazil. Trained without the gi.
Malla-yuddha: One of the oldest practiced forms of submission/combat wrestling, originating in pre-partition India, malla-yuddha is divided into four parent techniques, each named after particular Hindu gods and legendary fighters: Hanumanti concentrates on technical and positional superiority, Jambuvanti uses locks and holds to force the opponent into submission, Jarasandhi concentrates on breaking the limbs and joints and applying tracheal chokes while Bhimaseni focuses on sheer strength.
 Pehlwani: The premier wrestling style of South Asia. It is descended from Malla-yuddha and the Persian varzesh-e bastani.
Pankration: Originating from ancient Greece, it combines elements which today are found mainly in the punches of boxing (pygmachia) and in the kicking of many martial arts (laktisma) with moves from the also Greece-originating wrestling (pale) and joint locks, thus creating a broad fighting sport similar to today's mixed martial arts.
10th Planet Jiu-Jitsu: An American hybrid of no-gi Brazilian jiu-jitsu founded by Eddie Bravo, influences from American folk wrestling and Jean Jacques Machado's (a grappler with several missing digits) style of BJJ. More focus on no-gi half-guard and guard techniques that may be considered unorthodox in BJJ.
Shoot wrestling: A Japanese martial art (without the gi) based on freestyle wrestling, Greco-Roman wrestling, Sambo, and catch wrestling, which later incorporated karate, Muay Thai, and judo. The two major sub-disciplines of shoot wrestling are shooto and shootfighting.
Shooto: A Japanese martial art consisting of catch wrestling, judo, jujutsu, sambo, and kickboxing developed by professional wrestler Satoru Sayama.
Shootfighting:  A Japanese martial art consisting of Muay Thai and catch wrestling.
 Shuai Jiao: A Chinese style of wrestling that incorporates throws and chin na (joint locks).

Hybrid Styles

Combat Jiu-Jitsu

Combat Jiu-Jitsu (CJJ) is a Brazilian jiu-jitsu No-Gi / MMA hybrid invented by American BJJ black belt Eddie Bravo in 2013. Following the success of his Eddie Bravo Invitational (EBI) events, Bravo decided to create a martial art aimed for self-defence that could also be used in competition. Inspired from Pancrase matches as well as from the original Gracie Challenge.

CJJ incorporates No-Gi BJJ techniques while adding open palm strikes allowing competitors to strike each other on the ground to open up the defense, CJJ matches are only won by submission as CJJ has no point system. 

First ran as competitive matches during his invitational events, starting with EBI 11 in 2017, the first Combat Jiu-Jitsu World event took place in 2018.

Combat Submission Wrestling

Combat Submission Wrestling (CSW) is a modern form of submission wrestling (and MMA system), without the gi, developed by Erik Paulson, former Shooto light heavyweight champion.
It encompasses more areas, focusing on clinching, submissions, takedowns, grappling and striking.
It's a style that borrows elements and techniques from catch wrestling, freestyle wrestling, Greco-Roman wrestling, shoot wrestling, judo and sambo on the grappling aspect.
It also blends techniques of striking taken from Boxing, Kickboxing, Lethwei and Savate.
Some notorious fighters that have come out of CSW are Sean Sherk, Josh Barnett and Ken Shamrock.

Guerilla Jiu-Jitsu

Guerrilla Jiu-Jitsu is a submission grappling hybrid invented by american BJJ and Judo black belt Dave Camarillo in 2006.
Camarillo comes from a family of Judokas and he was fully emerged in the martial art after training in Japan.
After and injury during stand up, he started training in Brazilian Jiu-Jitsu under Ralph Gracie.
He became a black belt after 6 years he has been teaching his style ever since.
Guerilla Jiu-Jitsu focuses mainly on grappling and it's a mixture of Judo and Brazilian Jiu-Jitsu.
However, it's also considered quite aggressive, with its pratictioner focusing heavily on submissions as much as positions.

Hayastan Freestyle Wrestling

Hayastan Grappling System or Hayastan freestyle wrestling, is a submission grappling style developed by multiple grappling black belts Gokor Chivichyan and Gene LeBell that  blends elements of judo, sambo, catch wrestling, Brazilian jiu-jitsu, Greco-Roman and freestyle wrestling.
This system includes all forms of submissions, including leg locks, footlocks, kneebars, heel hooks, shoulder locks, wrist locks, neck cranks, body cranks, chokes and others.

Submission Arts Wrestling 

Submission Arts Wrestling (SAW) [サブミッションアーツレスリング] is a modern Catch Wrestling based Japanese Martial Art that incorporates elements from Sumo, Free Style Wretling, Catch as Catch Can Wrestling, Sambo and Judo. Founded in the 1980's by Hidetaka Aso, a student of Karl Gotch, SAW constitutes a Gi and No Gi grappling and striking system that focuses in forcing ones opponent to submit by means of throws, takedowns, chokes, toe locks, finger locks, pressure points and joint locks. As a form of Catch Can Wrestling, SAW is well known for its efficient leg locks repertoire. SAW practitioners are also skilled in the use of strikes such as hand, foot, knee and elbows since Submission Arts Wrestlers compete in all known fighting formats such as Sport Jujitsu, BJJ, MMA, Catch Wrestling and/or any other sanction combat sports. 

Some of the skills developed in SAW are:

Kumi Waza (to grapple),
Nage Waza (to throw),
Osaekomi Waza (to pin down),
Suīpu (to sweep),
Shime Waza (to strangle),
Kansetsu Waza (to joint lock) and
Atemi Waza (Strikes).

Submission Arts Wrestling is practiced on a wrestling mat (tatami). Submission Arts Wrestling (SAW) is currently practiced in Japan - Aso Sensei, Australia - Ito Sensei, Hawaii, and Puerto Rico (United States) - Ramos Sensei.

Grappling Tournaments and Organizations
ADCC Submission Wrestling World Championship
International Brazilian Jiu-Jitsu Federation
World IBJJF Jiu-Jitsu No-Gi Championship
European IBJJF Jiu-Jitsu No-Gi Championship
Pan IBJJF Jiu-Jitsu No-Gi Championship
Brazilian Nationals Jiu-Jitsu No-Gi Championship
United World Wrestling
NAGA
Grapplers Quest

See also
Styles of wrestling

References

 
Martial arts terminology
Combat sports
Wrestling
Professional wrestling styles